Swedish popular music, or shortly Swedish pop music, refers to music that has swept the Swedish mainstream at any given point in recent times. After World War II, Swedish pop music was heavily influenced by American jazz, and then by rock-and-roll from the U.S. and the U.K. in the 1950s and 1960s, before developing into dansband music. Since the 1970s, Swedish pop music has come to international prominence with bands singing in English, ranking high on the British, New Zealand, American, and Australian charts and making Sweden one of the world's top exporter of popular music by gross domestic product.

History

Post-war
With the influx of American G.I.s into Europe in the 1940s, styles of American music seeded themselves into Swedish culture. Many Swedish dansorkestrar ("dance orchestras") played jitterbug, foxtrot, and swing music and other jazz-derived tunes for people to dance to. In the 1950s early rock and roll, as well as country music and German schlager also infused the market, influencing Swedish musicians to build upon these styles, gradually moving them away from jazz, which was turning more toward the avant garde.

1960s

The jazz orchestra dancing in Scandinavia was interrupted by the counterculture of the 1960s, whose influences of left-wing politics and LSD were altering the shape of popular music around the world. In 1967 the first psychedelic and progressive rock groups emerged in Stockholm's Filips club, including Hansson & Karlsson, the Baby Grandmothers, and Mecki Mark Men. These groups were very popular in the Sweden of the late 60s, with television appearances, sold-out concerts, and tours around Europe. Mecki Mark Men even spent three months in the U.S. where they played big rock music festivals with Sly and the Family Stone, Jethro Tull, Pentangle, Mountain, Grand Funk Railroad, Paul Butterfield, and The Byrds. Aside from this music that blended rock, jazz, and folk music with improvisation and experimentation, Swedish progressive rock, or "progg" as it became known, was also fiercely political. Progg bands would go on to support efforts against war and nuclear power, or protest competitive events like Eurovision, stating, "Music cannot be a contest."

Due to the sheer popularity that the Beatles received in Sweden, they inspired countless other bands to form and write original compositions. Some of the most popular bands performing pop-music during this era were the Hep Stars, The Shanes, Ola & the Janglers and Tages. All of these bands, to some degree, wrote their own material, including Benny Andersson, who with the Hep Stars wrote the singles "No Response" (1965), "Sunny Girl", "Wedding" and "Consolation" (all 1966). Tages, despite their enormous success in Sweden, decided to try an international career. They recorded several albums in doing so, including one of the earliest psychedelic albums, Extra Extra. In 1967, the band incorporated traditional Swedish music into their performances. Their final album Studio is a prime example of this. Studio features solely original material and is considered one of the best Swedish albums of the 1960s.

1970s: Dansbandmusik and ABBA

The term "dansband" was coined around 1970, when Swedish popular music developed a signature style with brightly characterized lyrics and catchy melodies. The following decade became the golden era of dansband music, with groups like Thorleifs, Flamingokvintetten, Ingmar Nordströms, Wizex and Matz Bladhs rising to popularity in Sweden. In 1977, the song "Beatles", performed by Swedish dansband Forbes, won the Swedish Melodifestivalen 1977 and finished 18th (last) in the Eurovision Song Contest 1977.

For tax purposes, performers found a loophole in declaring "fantasy" outfits as deductibles to one's income, the reason being that it shouldn't be possible to wear the same outfit in your daily life. This led to many bands wearing highly extravagant matched outfits in their stage performances.

April 6, 1974 marks the start of a new era in Swedish pop music. First, Blue Swede reached #1 on the Billboard Hot 100 with their cover of the B. J. Thomas song "Hooked on a Feeling". The combo (fronted by iconic actor/singer Bjorn Skifs) also covered "Half Breed", "Never My Love", and "A Song For You"; as made famous by Cher, The Association, and The Carpenters, respectively. These renditions appeared on at least one "best-of" album, though never officially offered for sale anywhere beyond Europe.

The very same day, ABBA won the Eurovision Song Contest in Brighton, England, with "Waterloo". It was a big success throughout Europe, and reached number six on the Billboard Hot 100. 
Over the next few years ABBA had 18 consecutive top ten hits in the UK, nine of them reaching number one. Having sold an estimated 370 million units worldwide, ABBA became the best-selling band of the 1970s. In 1977, "Dancing Queen" became ABBA's only number one hit on the Billboard Hot 100. ABBA and Led Zeppelin are the only acts to have had 8 consecutive UK #1 albums.

Shortly after the release of their seventh album Super Trouper (1980), Benny Andersson and Anni-Frid Lyngstad of ABBA decided to end their marriage, just as Björn Ulvaeus and Agnetha Fältskog had done two years prior. This event did not stop the foursome from working together. ABBA's eighth album The Visitors was released in November 1981. Feeling that the energy was running out of the group, they decided to take a break in 1982. Fältskog and Lyngstad then both pursued solo careers. In 1982, Lyngstad released her first solo album in English, the Phil Collins produced Something's Going On. This was followed with the album Shine in 1984. Fältskog recorded three English solo albums during the 1980s, Wrap Your Arms Around Me (1983); Eyes of a Woman (1985), and I Stand Alone (1987). After a 17-year hiatus, Fältskog released My Colouring Book (2004), an album of 1960s cover versions. Her latest album A (2013) has been one of her most successful, earning her Platinum status in Sweden and Gold status in the UK, Germany and Australia.

Andersson and Ulvaeus collaborated with Tim Rice on the musical Chess which premiered in London in 1986. Two songs from the musical were hugely successful singles: "One Night in Bangkok" reached number three on the Billboard Hot 100, and "I Know Him So Well" topped the UK singles chart in February 1985.

In 1975, Harpo scored an international hit with the song Moviestar, with ABBA's Anni-Frid Lyngstad on backing vocals.

After a 35-year hiatus, it was announced in 2018 that ABBA had reunited and recorded two new songs for an upcoming "virtual" tour. In September 2021 they revealed a brand new studio album, Voyage, their first for 40 years. Released in November 2021, Voyage topped the album charts in numerous countries, including Australia, Germany and the UK.

1980s: Europe, Roxette and Neneh Cherry
In 1986, Europe, a hard rock band from Upplands Väsby, hit number one in 25 countries (including the UK) with the song "The Final Countdown". The album of the same name also charted around the world and sold more than 7 million copies worldwide, 3 million copies in the United States alone. The single has sold 8 million copies. The following year included successful tours through Europe, Japan and the US. Their next album was Out of This World, which produced "Superstitious" as its biggest hit. This album sold about 3.5 million copies worldwide. These two multi-platinum albums placed Europe as one of the most successful hard rock bands in the world with album sales of more than 23 million records. After the release of Prisoners in Paradise, which sold only 1.2 million copies, Europe decided to take a break in 1992. They reformed in 2003 and produced four albums so far. They continue to record and tour.

Marie Fredriksson and Per Gessle formed the band Roxette in 1986. Four of their songs, "The Look", "Listen To Your Heart" (both 1989), "It Must Have Been Love" (1990) and "Joyride" (1991), reached number one on the Billboard Hot 100, while two further singles, "Dangerous" (1990) and "Fading Like a Flower" (1991), both peaked at number two on the Billboard Hot 100. Roxette's "Join The Joyride World Tour 91–92" attracted 1.7 million people around the world. In 1993, they became the first non-English speaking band ever to play at MTV Unplugged. In 1995, they became the first Western band to be allowed to perform in China since Wham! in 1985.

In 2003, Roxette was honoured with achievement medals by Swedish King Carl XVI Gustaf "for appreciated achievements in Sweden and internationally". To date, their best-selling albums are Joyride (11 million units) and Look Sharp! (9 million units). Overall, the duo has sold more than 45 million albums and 25 million singles worldwide.

Neneh Cherry released the worldwide hit single "Buffalo Stance" in 1988. The song peaked at No. 3 on both the UK Singles Chart and the US Billboard Hot 100. Cherry's debut album Raw Like Sushi was released in 1989, experimenting with merging hiphop and mainstream dance-pop. The album was BRIT Certified Platinum four months after release. Cherry was nominated for "Best New Artist" with Buffalo Stance at the 1989 MTV Video Music Awards and the song was nominated for "International Hit of the Year" at the 1990 Ivor Novello Awards. Cherry's second single, "Manchild" (1989), peaked at No. 2 in Germany, and at No. 5 in the UK, and was a top-10 success in six more countries. The music video was nominated for "Best Video" at the 1990 Brit Awards. Her third single, "Kisses on the Wind" (1989), reached top-20 in seven countries including the US, where it peaked at No. 8 on the Billboard Hot 100. In 1990 Cherry won two Brit Awards, and she was also nominated for "Best New Artist" at the 1990 Grammy Awards. 
Cherry would be high on the charts again in 1994 with the single "7 Seconds", a duet with the Senegalese singer/songwriter Youssou N'Dour. The song reached top-3 on charts in 14 countries including France, where it stayed at No. 1 for a record 16 consecutive weeks on the Singles Chart. It won "Best Song" at the 1994 MTV Europe Music Awards and was nominated for "International Hit of the Year" at the 1995 Ivor Novello Awards. In 2015 Neneh Cherry was inducted into the Swedish Music Hall of Fame.

1990s: The Cheiron phenomenon

Since the 1990s, Sweden's influence on the international pop music scene has been most evident via a number of heavyweight songwriters and producers. Cheiron Studios, spearheaded by Denniz Pop and his protégé Max Martin, helped Ace of Base become an international success, and then went on to creating some of the biggest hits of Britney Spears, Backstreet Boys, NSYNC and Westlife, to name just a few. Denniz Pop died from cancer in 1998 and Cheiron Studios was closed two years later, but Martin remains a superstar in the industry - only Paul McCartney and John Lennon have written more #1 Billboard hits than Max Martin. Other prominent producers who were part of Cheiron include Carl Falk, Rami Yacoub, Kristian Lundin, Jörgen Elofsson, Per Magnusson and Andreas Carlsson.

Ace of Base's first album Happy Nation (reissued as The Sign) is one of the best-selling debut albums of all time, and was certified nine times platinum in the United States. The reggae-influenced song "The Sign" was added to the album at its reissue in the U.S. and became a huge hit. It spent six non-consecutive weeks at number one on the Billboard Hot 100 chart and even became the top song on Billboard's 1994 Year End Chart. Today Ace of Base's four studio albums have sold more than 30 million copies worldwide, making them the third-most successful Swedish band of all time after ABBA and Roxette.

Several other Cheiron-propelled Swedish music artists reached international success in the 1990s, such as Dr. Alban, eurodance rappers E-Type and Leila K, and not least Robyn who had her US breakthrough in 1997 with the hit songs "Do You Know (What It Takes)" and "Show Me Love".

However, not all success stories were created by Cheiron. Rock band The Cardigans was formed in Jönköping in 1992 and after steadily gaining popularity at home and in Japan, they became a global name in 1996 through their third album First Band on the Moon. The hit single Lovefool was featured on the soundtrack to the film Romeo + Juliet.

A*Teens were formed in 1998 as an ABBA tribute band. Their 1999 debut album The ABBA Generation consisted purely of ABBA covers and was a great success around the world. The album sold 3 million copies worldwide. The singles "Mamma Mia" (UK #12) and "Dancing Queen" (UK #21) topped the charts in Sweden. Their second album Teen Spirit (2001) contained new songs and was certified Gold in the United States.

Other notable Swedish acts who had international hits during this decade are Army of Lovers, Yaki-Da, Stakka Bo, Rednex, Eagle Eye Cherry, Emilia, Teddybears and Meja.

2000s: Continued international success
The Cheiron legacy kept growing into the 21st century. Max Martin continued creating hit songs for stars like Britney Spears, Céline Dion and Pink, and he also helped bring forward new talented producers such as Shellback. Another producer who rose to fame during the 2000s is Swedish/Moroccan RedOne, who had huge success worldwide working alongside Lady Gaga, and later other American stars. He has been nominated for eight Grammy Awards and won two of those.

Robyn reappeared in 2007, after an absence of 10 years from the international music scene, with her #1 hit in the UK "With Every Heartbeat". The self-titled album was certified Gold in the UK and Platinum in Sweden.
The following singles reached the charts as well: "Handle Me" (UK #17), "Be Mine" (UK #10) and "Who's That Girl" (UK #26). "Dream On", the follow-up with Christian Falk, was originally released in 2006 on his album People Say. It was re-released in the UK in November 2008 peaking at #21. Robyn also collaborated with Norwegian duo Röyksopp for the single "The Girl and the Robot" in June 2009.

A number of dance-oriented Swedish acts became internationally successful during this decade. In 2004, Swedish DJ and producer Eric Prydz topped the UK charts for five weeks with "Call on Me", while its 2007 follow up "Proper Education" was a #2 success. In 2008 Prydz had a hit with "Pjanoo", which also reached #2 in the UK (on download sales alone).

Basshunter is a Swedish singer, record producer and DJ. "Boten Anna" is a song with Swedish lyrics that had some success in continental Europe in 2006. In 2008 it reached number one in the UK with lyrics performed in English under the title "Now You're Gone". The second single "All I Ever Wanted" peaked at number two in the UK.

September is a Swedish dance-singer whose song "Cry For You" reached number five in the UK in 2008.  In the 2010s, she released two albums under her true name, Petra Marklund, and relaunched herself as a Swedish-language pop artist rather than a Europop dance artist.

With "Crying at the Discoteque" the band Alcazar achieved success across Europe in 2000. It peaked at #3 in Germany and #13 in the UK. The follow-up singles failed to reach this success.

Another band which had success overseas were Play. Their biggest hit, "Us Against The World", sold over 500,000 copies. The song also featured in movies like The Master of Disguise and Holiday in the Sun, not forgetting the Lizzie McGuire series.

Rock band Mando Diao from Borlänge were very successful in Europe in 2009 with their song "Dance With Somebody" from the album Give Me Fire. It reached number three in Germany and was a major hit in Europe peaking at number 8 on the Billboard Eurochart Hot 100 Singles.

2010s: EDM stars and strong female acts 

2010 saw the rise of two major Swedish acts in electronic dance music (EDM). Swedish House Mafia, a supergroup collaboration between the Swedish DJs and producers Axwell, Steve Angello and Sebastian Ingrosso, released their first single "One", which was followed by a number of other hits including "Don't You Worry Child" which topped charts around the globe. Another DJ, Avicii got a smash-hit with "Seek Bromance", and was ranked as sixth on the Top 100 DJs list. Avicii, whose real name was Tim Bergling, released two successful albums, True and Stories, before his death in 2018.

The 2010s also saw successful releases from Agnes Carlsson and Robyn. Agnes, the winner of Sweden's Idol 2005, succeeded in Europe and especially the UK market in 2009/2010 with the single "Release Me", which entered the charts at number three and sold over 300,000 copies. It peaked at #6 on the Billboard Eurochart Hot 100 Singles. Carlsson was also signed to Universal Music/Interscope in the US, and started the promotion for the forthcoming album Dance Love Pop during the summer 2010. Robyn returned with her Body Talk series.

In 2011 the Swedish indie-artist Lykke Li released her second album Wounded Rhymes, and continued her success from her earlier Youth Novels with singles like "Get Some" and "I Follow Rivers", which topped the charts in Belgium and Romania.

Beginning in the 2000s, Veronica Maggio released several high-selling Swedish-language pop albums and continues to tour widely through Scandinavia.

In 2012, Swedish Eurovision Song Contest 2012 winner Loreen charted at number one in several countries across Europe with her song "Euphoria", making her one of the most successful winners of the contest in recent years.

In 2013, Swedish duo Icona Pop reached the top ten on the Billboard Hot 100 and number-one on the UK Singles Chart with their song "I Love It". The song was certified gold in the United Kingdom and 2× platinum in the United States, selling 400,000 and 2,025,000 copies, respectively. Icona Pop's Caroline Hjelt is close friends with singer/songwriter Tove Lo, who had her international breakthrough shortly afterwards. Tove Lo charted at number 3 on Billboard Hot 100 with her song "Habits (Stay High)" and the song was certified 5× Platinum in the United States.

Swedish singer/songwriter Zara Larsson released her debut EP album Introducing in January 2013. She later featured in the official song of UEFA Euro 2016, David Guetta's "This One's for You". Her album So Good produced eight singles and she charted at number 13 on the Billboard Hot 100 with "Never Forget You". The song was certified 2× Platinum in the U.S.

In 2015, Måns Zelmerlöw won the Eurovision Song Contest 2015 with his song "Heroes". The song charted in the multiple countries around Europe and Australia, peaking at number 11 in the United Kingdom.

Styles

Dance music 
Ace of Base had the world's best-selling debut album with 23 million in sales for Happy Nation. They achieved major success in the 1990s with popular songs such as "All That She Wants" (1993), "The Sign", "Don't Turn Around" (both 1994) and "Cruel Summer" (1998). All four songs reached the Top 10 of the Billboard Hot 100; "The Sign" spent six weeks at number one.

In the early 1990s the Swedish dance scene was very vivid. Denniz Pop was Sweden's most wanted producer of that time . In 1990 he produced Dr. Alban's first record "Hello Africa" together with Leila K. The song became a hit in mainland Europe peaking at #5 in Germany.

In 1992 Denniz Pop produced the second album by Dr. Alban, One Love which includes the worldwide hits "It's My Life" and "Sing Hallelujah". 
. That same year Leila K released her hit single "Open Sesame" (UK #23, Germany #5). This was followed in 1993 by a cover version of Plastic Bertrand's "Ça Plane Pour Moi" (Germany #13).

1994 saw the release of Dr. Alban's third album Look Who's Talking; the title track was a big hit throughout Europe (Germany #3).

Rednex had several hit songs mixing country music and eurodance. The song "Cotton Eye Joe" was an international hit in 1994 reaching number one in the UK. The ballad "Wish You Were Here" was released in 1995.

The Hellacopters, a garage rock band that was formed by Nicke Andersson, was also formed in 1995.

Swedish pop music 
In 1996 The Cardigans released their third album, First Band on the Moon. The song "Lovefool" was included on the soundtrack of William Shakespeare's Romeo + Juliet by director Baz Luhrmann. It found international success peaking at #2 on the UK Singles Chart. The following album, Gran Turismo (1998), was more electronic in style and contained the hit singles "My Favourite Game" and "Erase/Rewind".

"You and Me Song", by Swedish group The Wannadies, was a huge radio hit in the UK and Ireland in the mid-1990s. This song also ended up featuring on the Romeo + Juliet soundtrack.

Robyn was 17 years old when her pop singles "Show Me Love" and "Do You Know (What It Takes)" were released in 1997. Both singles were Top 10 hits on the Billboard Hot 100.

In 1998 Meja's second album Seven Sisters was released. It contained the radio hit "All Bout The Money", which was peaked at #12 in the UK. In 1999 she recorded the duet "Private Emotion" with Ricky Martin, which reached #9 on the UK singles chart.

Eagle-Eye Cherry released his debut album Desireless in 1998. Propelled by the hit single "Save Tonight" (UK #5, US #6), the album sold over 4 million copies worldwide.

Emilia Rydberg is well known for her 1998-1999 international hit "Big Big World". The song peaked at #5 in the UK.

Andreas Johnson had a UK #4 hit in 2000 with "Glorious".

Swedish songwriters/producers Denniz Pop and Max Martin have written worldwide hits for pop artists like Britney Spears, Backstreet Boys and later Celine Dion, Kelly Clarkson, Katy Perry, P!nk, Avril Lavigne, Leona Lewis and Jessie J.

Indie pop and rock

In the 2000s some indie bands from Sweden found their way to the international music scene.

Singer Nina Persson from The Cardigans launched a solo project in 2001 under the name A Camp. The lead single "I Can Buy You" peaking at number 46 in the UK chart. In 2003, The Cardigans returned with their album Long Gone Before Daylight, a quieter, more ambient collection of songs. In Sweden it was certified 2× platinum and the band won two Swedish Grammy Awards.

José González is a Swedish indie folk singer-songwriter of Argentine descent. His cover of "Heartbeats", originally by his fellow Swedes The Knife, was a hit on the UK singles chart where it peaked at number nine in 2003.

The Tallest Man on Earth is the stage name of Swedish folk singer songwriter Kristian Matsson.

Indie band The Concretes first appeared in the UK Singles Chart in 2004 with "You Can't Hurry Love" (#55) and "Seem Fine" (#52). Lead singer Victoria Bergsman left the group in 2006 and, with Peter, Bjorn and John, recorded the single "Young Folks" the same year. This reached #35 in the UK singles chart, and was re-issued the following year, this time peaking at #13.

On the national scene, Kent are by many seen as the greatest indie band, having sold more than 2 million copies of their albums and repeatedly been awarded best group of the year awards. Håkan Hellström can in some way be seen as a solo artist counterpart, having gained both public and critical acclaim.

Other notable artists include refused, Air France, bob hund, ceo, Dungen, Eskobar, Fever Ray, First Aid Kit, The Hives, Jens Lekman, The Knife, Komeda, Life on Earth, Little Dragon, Lykke Li, The Radio Dept., Shout Out Louds, The Soundtrack of Our Lives, The Sounds, The Tough Alliance, The Field, and Avner.

Eurovision Song Contest

Sweden has participated in the Eurovision Song Contest 57 times since making its debut in 1958, missing only three contests since then (1964, 1970 and 1976). Sweden is one of the most successful competing nations at the Eurovision, with a total of six victories in the contest, only behind Ireland who have seven wins:
 1974 ABBA with "Waterloo";
 1984 Herreys with "Diggi-Loo Diggi-Ley";
 1991 Carola Häggkvist with "Fångad av en stormvind";
 1999 Charlotte Nilsson with "Take Me To Your Heaven";
 2012 Loreen with "Euphoria";
 2015 Måns Zelmerlöw with "Heroes".

Sweden is the contest's most successful country of the 21st century, with two wins from ten top five results. In total, Sweden has achieved 24 top five results in the contest. Since 1959, the Swedish entry has been chosen through an annual televised competition, known since 1967 as Melodifestivalen. Sweden has hosted the Eurovision Song Contest six times and is the only country to have hosted the event in five different decades, three times in Stockholm (1975, 2000, and 2016), twice in Malmö (1992 and 2013), and once in Gothenburg (1985).

Charts and sales

Top 15 biggest selling Swedish acts 
The sales figures are estimated and count together album and single sales.

Album sales by country 
This tables shows the album sales by country. The worldwide album sales are estimated while the album sales for UK, US and Germany are counted by the gold and platinum certifications for the albums in that country. For Germany, the old certifications were used for albums released before September 1999 with Gold (250,000) and Platinum (500,000).

Biggest hit singles 
The following songs achieved the highest aggregated positions in the charts in their respective years. The following list shows the Swedish hits that ended up in the top 10 Billboard Hot 100 charts.

US and UK hit singles
This is a list of songs which reached the top 200 on the UK singles chart or the Billboard Hot 100, as well as other notable global hits.

Top selling Swedish studio and compilation albums

See also
List over Swedish Artists by Albums and Singles Sold
Nordic popular music

References

External links

Sweden.se/music — Sweden's official music room – A music player with contemporary Swedish music

Popular music
Popular music by country